Jamil Takidine (born 
1 June 2002) is a Belgian professional footballer who plays for Roda JC Kerkrade in the Eerste Divisie.

Early life
Takidine came through the youth academy at his hometown club KRC Genk in Belgium. His brother Ilias Takidine is in the youth academy at R.S.C. Anderlecht having moved across from Genk in 2020.

Career
Takidine was at KRC Genk until 2021 when he joined Roda JC Kerkrade. He made his senior debut on 13 August, 2021 appearing as a substitute in a home match for Roda against Excelsior Rotterdam in the Eerste Divisie. Takidine made his first starting appearance for Roda in the KNVB Cup against FC Den Bosch in December 2021. In August 2022, Takidine signed a new professional contract with Roda until 2024 despite missing three months of the previous season with injury. Roda head coach Jurgen Streppel said of Takidine “Jamil has shown that he has willpower and perseverance. He is a hard worker and he gives everything every day to get better.”

Personal life
Born in Belgium, Takidine is of Moroccan descent.

References

External links

2002 births
Living people
Association football midfielders
Belgian footballers
Belgian sportspeople of Moroccan descent
Eerste Divisie players
Belgian expatriates in the Netherlands
Belgian expatriate sportspeople in the Netherlands
Roda JC Kerkrade players
K.R.C. Genk players
Sportspeople from Genk